Thirty Island Lake is a lake of southern Ontario, Canada, located northwest of Frontenac Provincial Park in Frontenac County.

See also
List of lakes in Ontario

References
 

Lakes of Frontenac County